Linda Margaret Larson (born 1948 or 1949) is a Canadian politician, who was elected to the Legislative Assembly of British Columbia in the 2013 provincial election. She represented the electoral district of Boundary-Similkameen as a member of the British Columbia Liberal Party until 2020.

Prior to her election to the Legislative Assembly, Larson was a municipal councillor and mayor in Oliver.

Electoral record

References

British Columbia Liberal Party MLAs
Women MLAs in British Columbia
British Columbia municipal councillors
Living people
People from Oliver, British Columbia
Women municipal councillors in Canada
21st-century Canadian politicians
21st-century Canadian women politicians
1940s births